The North American Allied Fight Series (NAAFS) was an Ohio-based mixed martial arts promotion, having put on over 125 events. The weekly NAAFS Cage Fighting series airs regionally on SportsTime Ohio, nationally on Direct TV and Dish Network, and internationally on G-TV. NAAFS also works closely with the national MMA promotion Bellator Fighting Championships to fill open spots on their cards.

NAAFS alumni

 Stipe Miocic
 Cody Garbrandt
 Jeff Monson
 Katlyn Chookagian
 Matt Brown
 Ben Rothwell
 Phil Davis
 Jason Dent
 Sean Salmon
 Dave Herman
 Brian Rogers
 Donny Walker
 Frank Caraballo
 John Hawk
 Brian Camozzi

References

Sports organizations established in 2005
Mixed martial arts organizations